Lusernetta is a comune (municipality) in the Metropolitan City of Turin in the Italian region Piedmont, located about  southwest of Turin.

Lusernetta borders the following municipalities: Luserna San Giovanni and Bibiana.

References

Cities and towns in Piedmont